The Amykos Painter (active around 430–400 BC in Lucania) was the name given to a South Italian vase painter who worked in the ancient Greek  red-figure pottery technique. His exact date of birth and death are unknown.

As with any of the artisans working during the (late) fifth century BC, very little is understood about the Amykos Painter's life. It is generally agreed by scholars that the Amykos Painter learned his trade in Athens. He owes his name to a depiction on a Lucanian hydria depicting Amykos, who was the featured subject in one of his surviving works which currently resides at the Cabinet des Médailles, Paris. Among countless other vases, there is also a red-figure bell-krater depicting Silenus and two maenads which has been attributed to him.

See also
Corpus vasorum antiquorum

References
Boardman, John. The History of Greek Vases. London: Thames and Hudson, 2001.
Cook, R.M. Greek Painted Pottery. 3rd ed. London: Routledge, 1997. 
 Beazley, J. D. Paralipomena: Additions to Attic Black-figure Vase-painters and to Attic Red-figure Vase-painters (second edition),. Oxford: Clarendon, 1971.
 Folsom, Robert S. Attic Red Figure Pottery. Park City, NJ: Noyes, 1976. Print.

External links

Works at the British Museum, London.
Works at the Metropolitan Museum of Art, New York.
Lucanian nestoris at the Louvre, Paris.
Images at Perseus site

5th-century BC deaths
Ancient Greek vase painters
Anonymous artists of antiquity
Year of birth unknown
Year of death unknown
Collection of the Cabinet des Médailles, Paris